Cistanthe ambigua (formerly Calandrinia ambigua) is a species of flowering plant in the family Montiaceae known by the common name desert pussypaws. It is native to the deserts of northern Mexico and Arizona and California in the United States, where it grows in sandy soils. This is an annual herb producing an upright stem to a maximum height of about 18 centimeters. The thick leaves are linear to spoon-shaped and grow along the stem rather than in a basal rosette at the base of the plant. The inflorescence is a tight cluster of white flowers with 3 to 5 petals each a few millimeters long. The fruit is a capsule containing up to 15 minute shiny black seeds.

External links

Jepson Manual Treatment
Photo gallery

ambigua